In graph theory, a strongly regular graph  (SRG) is defined as follows.  Let  be a regular graph with  vertices and degree .   is said to be strongly regular if there are also integers  and  such that:

 Every two adjacent vertices have  common neighbours.
 Every two non-adjacent vertices have  common neighbours.

A strongly regular graph is a distance-regular graph with diameter 2 whenever μ is non-zero. It is a locally linear graph whenever .

Etymology
A strongly regular graph is denoted an srg(v, k, λ, μ) in the literature. By convention, graphs which satisfy the definition trivially are excluded from detailed studies and lists of strongly regular graphs. These include the disjoint union of one or more equal-sized complete graphs, and their complements, the complete multipartite graphs with equal-sized independent sets.

Andries Brouwer and Hendrik van Maldeghem (see #References) use an alternate but fully equivalent definition of a strongly regular graph based on spectral graph theory: a strongly regular graph is a finite regular graph that has exactly three eigenvalues, only one of which is equal to the degree k, of multiplicity 1. This automatically rules out fully connected graphs (which have only two distinct eigenvalues, not three) and disconnected graphs (whose multiplicity of the degree k is equal to the number of different connected components, which would therefore exceed one). Much of the literature, including Brouwer, refer to the larger eigenvalue as r (with multiplicty f) and the smaller one as s (with multiplicity g).

History
Strongly regular graphs were introduced by R.C. Bose in 1963. They built upon earlier work in the 1950s in the then-new field of spectral graph theory.

Examples
 The cycle of length 5 is an srg(5, 2, 0, 1).
 The Petersen graph is an srg(10, 3, 0, 1).
 The Clebsch graph is an srg(16, 5, 0, 2).
 The Shrikhande graph is an srg(16, 6, 2, 2) which is not a distance-transitive graph.
 The n × n square rook's graph, i.e., the line graph of a balanced complete bipartite graph Kn,n, is an srg(n2, 2n − 2, n − 2, 2).  The parameters for  coincide with those of the Shrikhande graph, but the two graphs are not isomorphic.
 The Chang graphs are srg(28, 12, 6, 4), the same as the line graph of K8, but these four graphs are not isomorphic.
 The line graph of a generalized quadrangle GQ(2, 4) is an srg(27, 10, 1, 5). In fact every generalized quadrangle of order (s, t) gives a strongly regular graph in this way: to wit, an srg((s + 1)(st + 1), s(t + 1), s − 1, t + 1).
 The Schläfli graph is an srg(27, 16, 10, 8).
 The Hoffman–Singleton graph is an srg(50, 7, 0, 1).
 The Sims-Gewirtz graph is an (56, 10, 0, 2).
 The M22 graph aka the Mesner graph is an srg(77, 16, 0, 4).
 The Brouwer–Haemers graph is an srg(81, 20, 1, 6).
 The Higman–Sims graph is an srg(100, 22, 0, 6).
 The Local McLaughlin graph is an srg(162, 56, 10, 24).  
 The Cameron graph is an srg(231, 30, 9, 3).
 The Berlekamp–van Lint–Seidel graph is an srg(243, 22, 1, 2).
 The McLaughlin graph is an srg(275, 112, 30, 56).
 The Paley graph of order q is an srg(q, (q − 1)/2, (q − 5)/4, (q − 1)/4).
 self-complementary arc-transitive graphs are strongly regular.

A strongly regular graph is called primitive if both the graph and its complement are connected.

Conway's 99-graph problem asks for the construction of an srg(99, 14, 1, 2). It is unknown whether a graph with these parameters exists, and John Horton Conway offered a $1000 prize for the solution to this problem.

Triangle-free graphs
The strongly regular graphs with λ = 0 are triangle free. Apart from the complete graphs on less than 3 vertices and all complete bipartite graphs the seven listed earlier (pentagon, Petersen, Clebsch, Hoffman-Singleton, Gewirtz, Mesner-M22, and Higman-Sims) are the only known ones.

Geodetic graphs
These are called the Moore graphs and are explored below in more detail. Other combinations of parameters such as (400, 21, 2, 1) have not yet been ruled out. Despite ongoing research on the properties that a strongly regular graph with  would have, it is not known whether any more exist or even whether their number is finite. Only the elementary result is known, that  cannot be 1 for such a graph.

Algebraic properties of strongly regular graphs

Basic relationship between parameters
The four parameters in an srg(v, k, λ, μ) are not independent. They must obey the following relation:

The above relation is derived through a counting argument as follows:
 Imagine the vertices of the graph to lie in three levels. Pick any vertex as the root, in Level 0. Then its k neighbors lie in Level 1, and all other vertices lie in Level 2.
 Vertices in Level 1 are directly connected to the root, hence they must have λ other neighbors in common with the root, and these common neighbors must also be in Level 1. Since each vertex has degree k, there are  edges remaining for each Level 1 node to connect to nodes in Level 2. Therefore, there are  edges between Level 1 and Level 2.
 Vertices in Level 2 are not directly connected to the root, hence they must have μ common neighbors with the root, and these common neighbors must all be in Level 1. There are  vertices in Level 2, and each is connected to μ nodes in Level 1.
 Equating the two expressions for the edges between Level 1 and Level 2, the relation follows.

Adjacency matrix equations
Let I denote the identity matrix and let J denote the matrix of ones, both matrices of order v.  The adjacency matrix A of a strongly regular graph satisfies two equations.

First:

which is a restatement of the regularity requirement. This shows that k is an eigenvalue of the adjacency matrix with the all-ones eigenvector.

Second:

which expresses strong regularity. The ij-th element of the left hand side gives the number of two-step paths from i to j. The first term of the right hand side gives the number of two-step paths from i back to i, namely k edges out and back in. The second term gives the number of two-step paths when i and j are directly connected. The third term gives the corresponding value when i and j are not connected. Since the three cases are mutually exclusive and collectively exhaustive, the simple additive equality follows.

Conversely, a graph whose adjacency matrix satisfies both of the above conditions and which is not a complete or null graph is a strongly regular graph.

Eigenvalues and graph spectrum
Since the adjacency matrix A is symmetric, it follows that its eigenvectors are orthogonal. We already observed one eigenvector above which is made of all ones, corresponding to the eigenvalue k. Therefore the other eigenvectors x must all satisfy  where J is the all-ones matrix as before. Take the previously established equation:

and multiply the above equation by eigenvector x:

Call the corresponding eigenvalue p (not to be confused with  the graph parameter) and substitute ,  and :

Eliminate x and rearrange to get a quadratic:

This gives the two additional eigenvalues . There are thus exactly three eigenvalues for a strongly regular matrix.

Conversely, a connected regular graph with only three eigenvalues is strongly regular.

Following the terminology in much of the strongly regular graph literature, the larger eigenvalue is called r with multiplicity f and the smaller one is called s with multiplicity g.

Since the sum of all the eigenvalues is the trace of the adjacency matrix, which is zero in this case, the respective multiplicities f and g can be calculated:
 Eigenvalue k has multiplicity 1.
 Eigenvalue  has multiplicity .
 Eigenvalue  has multiplicity .

As the multiplicities must be integers, their expressions provide further constraints on the values of v, k, μ, and λ.

Strongly regular graphs for which  have integer eigenvalues with unequal multiplicities.

Their parameters reduce to
 
Further, in this case, v must equal the sum of two squares, related to the Bruck–Ryser–Chowla theorem.

Further properties of the eigenvalues and their multiplicities are:
 , therefore 
 
 
 
 The frame quotient condition: . As a corollary,  if and only if  in some order.
 Krein conditions:  and 
If the above condition(s) are violated for any set of parameters, then there exists no strongly regular graph for those parameters. Brouwer has compiled such lists of existence or non-existence here with reasons for non-existence if any.

The Hoffman–Singleton theorem
As noted above, the multiplicities of the eigenvalues are given by 

which must be integers.

In 1960, Alan Hoffman and Robert Singleton examined those expressions when applied on Moore graphs that have λ = 0 and μ = 1. Such graphs are free of triangles (otherwise λ would exceed zero) and quadrilaterals (otherwise μ would exceed 1), hence they have a girth (smallest cycle length) of 5. Substituting the values of λ and μ in the equation , it can be seen that , and the eigenvalue multiplicities reduce to

For the multiplicities to be integers, the quantity  must be rational, therefore either the numerator  is zero or the denominator  is an integer.

If the numerator  is zero, the possibilities are:
 k = 0 and v = 1 yields a trivial graph with one vertex and no edges, and 
 k = 2 and v = 5 yields the 5-vertex cycle graph , usually drawn as a regular pentagon.

If the denominator  is an integer t, then  is a perfect square , so . Substituting:

Since both sides are integers,  must be an integer, therefore t is a factor of 15, namely , therefore . In turn:
 k = 1 and v = 2 yields a trivial graph of two vertices joined by an edge,
 k = 3 and v = 10 yields the Petersen graph,
 k = 7 and v = 50 yields the Hoffman–Singleton graph, discovered by Hoffman and Singleton in the course of this analysis, and
 k = 57 and v = 3250 predicts a famous graph that has neither been discovered since 1960, nor has its existence been disproven.

The Hoffman-Singleton theorem states that there are no strongly regular girth-5 Moore graphs except the ones listed above.

See also
 Partial geometry
 Seidel adjacency matrix
 Two-graph

Notes

References
 Andries Brouwer and Hendrik van Maldeghem (2022), Strongly Regular Graphs. Cambridge: Cambridge University Press. . 
 A.E. Brouwer, A.M. Cohen, and A. Neumaier (1989), Distance Regular Graphs.  Berlin, New York: Springer-Verlag.  , 
 Chris Godsil and Gordon Royle (2004), Algebraic Graph Theory.  New York: Springer-Verlag.

External links
 Eric W. Weisstein, Mathworld article with numerous examples.
 Gordon Royle, List of larger graphs and families.
 Andries E. Brouwer, Parameters of Strongly Regular Graphs.
 Brendan McKay, Some collections of graphs.
 Ted Spence, Strongly regular graphs on at most 64 vertices.

Graph families
Algebraic graph theory
Regular graphs